The white-flanked sunbird (Aethopyga eximia) is a species of bird in the family Nectariniidae.
It is endemic to Indonesia.

Its natural habitat is subtropical or tropical moist montane forests.

References

white-flanked sunbird
Birds of Java
white-flanked sunbird
Taxonomy articles created by Polbot